Park Myung-keun (September 7, 1928 – December 9, 2004) was a former South Korean Army captain, prosecutor, and a member of the 8th, 9th, 10th, and 14th South Korean National Assembly. He represented the Democratic Republican Party for his first three terms and the Democratic Libertarian Party for his last term. Under the Park Chung-hee administration, he worked as the chief of the Office of the President (大統領秘書室) and the Vice Leader of the Democratic Republican Party.

Early life and education 
Park was born on September 7, 1928, in 199th district, Yeongtae-ri, Wollong-myeon, Paju-si. He was the only son of Park Seung-nyun and Kim Jong-sun. His father passed away when he was two years old.

After graduating from high school, he received a degree in political science from Seoul National University.

Park was fluent in Japanese.

Military career

Early career

Political career 
When Park was a secretary to President Park Chung-hee, he was known to be one of the President's favorites. Some of the largest projects under the administration in which Park had an instrumental role included the construction of the Gyeongbu Expressway, the most used highway in the country, where he worked with his close friend Chung Ju-yung, the founder of Hyundai Group.

Post-political career

Death and funeral 
Park died on December 9, 2004 at Samsung Medical Center. The funeral was held on the 11th at 8 A.M. He is survived by his wife and children.

Monument construction 
In early 2008, the 14-member "Monument Construction Committee" (송덕비 건립추진위원회) was found. The committee was headed by Kim Chul-young, who was a former town mayor of Moon-san.

In December 14, 2008, the monument unveiling ceremony was held. The ceremony was attended by over hundred people, including members of the National Assembly, the mayor of Paju, the representative of the Gyeonggi Province, members of the provincial council of Gyeonggi, the chair of the Gyeonggi department of education, and the alderman. The monument was funded by donations.

Below is the text engraved on the monument, written by Song Dal-yong, who was a former mayor of Paju, and engraved by Lim Jae-cheol. The text is written in Korean mixed script.

References

South Korean politicians
1928 births
2004 deaths